The Battle of Sabana Real took place on January 21, 1691. An army of 700 Dominican raiders and 2,600 militiamen aboard five warships of the Armada de Barlovento, circled and overwhelmed 1,000 French defenders at Sabana de la Limonade; Governor de Cussy and 400 of his followers were killed.

This incident, among others, led Spain to formally recognize French control of some Caribbean territory in the Treaty of Ryswick in order to avoid further conflicts again in the future: Tortuga Island and the western third of the adjacent island of Hispaniola, where the French colony of Saint-Domingue was later established.

References

History of the Colony of Santo Domingo
17th century in the Dominican Republic
17th century in Haiti
Sabana Real
Sabana Real
Sabana Real